Francesco D'Aniello (born 21 March 1969 in Nettuno) is an Italian trap shooter. At the 2008 Summer Olympics he won the silver medal in the men's double trap event. After realizing he had won silver, D'Aniello was overcome with emotion and collapsed to his knees weeping.  He was less successful in the 2012 Summer Olympics, finishing 8th in the qualifying round and not qualifying for the final.

References

External links
 

1969 births
Living people
People from Nettuno
Italian male sport shooters
Olympic shooters of Italy
Shooters at the 2008 Summer Olympics
Olympic silver medalists for Italy
Trap and double trap shooters
Olympic medalists in shooting
Shooters at the 2012 Summer Olympics
Medalists at the 2008 Summer Olympics
Shooters of Fiamme Oro
Sportspeople from the Metropolitan City of Rome Capital